Isaac Oluyamo is an Anglican bishop in Nigeria: a former archdeacon he has been the Bishop of Ijesha North since 2015.

Notes

Living people
Anglican bishops of Ijesha North Missionary
21st-century Anglican bishops in Nigeria
Year of birth missing (living people)
Church of Nigeria archdeacons